Jean-Nicolas-Louis Durand (Paris, 18 September 1760 – Thiais, 31 December 1834) was a French author, teacher and architect. He was an important figure in Neoclassicism, and his system of design using simple modular elements anticipated modern industrialized building components. Having spent periods working for the architect Étienne-Louis Boullée and the civil engineer Jean-Rodolphe Perronet, he became a Professor of Architecture at the École Polytechnique in 1795.

See also 
 Étienne-Louis Boullée
 Leo von Klenze
 Gustav Vorherr
 Friedrich Weinbrenner

Bibliography 
 Nouveau précis des leçons d'architecture : données a l'Ecole impériale polytechnique by J.N.L. Durand pub. Fantin; (1813)
 Précis des leçons d'architecture données à l'École royale polytechnique by J.N.L. Durand. pub. Chez l'auteur; (1809)
 Recueil et parallèle des édifices de tout genre, anciens et modernes : remarquables par leur beauté, par leur grandeur, ou par leur singularité, et dessinés sur une même échelle by J.N.L. Durand. pub. D. Avanzo; (1830?)
 Recueil et parallèle des édifices de tout genre, anciens et modernes : remarquables par leur beauté, par leur grandeur, ou par leur singularité, et dessinés sur une même échelle by J.N.L. Durand. pub. l'Imprimerie de Gillé fils; (1799 or 1800)

1760 births
Writers from Paris
Architects from Paris
1834 deaths
18th-century French architects
French neoclassical architects
Academic staff of École Polytechnique
French architecture writers